Tosagestin (developmental code name ORG-30659), also known as 11-methylene-δ15-norethisterone or 17α-ethynyl-11-methylene-19-nor-δ15-testosterone, is a progestin of the 19-nortestosterone group which was under development by Organon in the United States and Europe as a hormonal contraceptive (in combination with ethinylestradiol) and for the treatment of menopausal symptoms but was never marketed.

See also
 Gestodene

References

External links
 Tosagestin - AdisInsight

Abandoned drugs
Tertiary alcohols
Ethynyl compounds
Dienes
Estranes
Hormonal contraception
Ketones
Progestogens